Mycetomoellerius turrifex is a species of fungus farming ant in the myrmicine genus Mycetomoellerius. The species was formerly placed in the genus Trachymyrmex, but was moved to the newly erected genus Mycetomoellerius by Solomon et al (2019) based on molecular phylogenetic analysis.

Subspecies
Two subspecies had been previously recognized in the species T. turrifex caroli  and T. t. turrifex , however Solomon et al (2019) did not recover any subspecies as distinct.

References

External links

 

Myrmicinae
Insects described in 1903